Trachelium may refer to:

Trachelium (architecture), a part of a Doric or Ionic column
Trachelium (insect), a genus of insects in the broad-headed bug family, Alydidae
Trachelium (plant), a genus of plants in the bellflower family, Campanulaceae